Poor Cecily (also known as Lady in Trouble) is a 1974 American drama and adult film directed and produced by Lee Frost.  Music direction is by Leland Sythe. The film stars Angela Field, William Quinn, Sandy Dempsey and Cindy Summers in the lead roles.

Cast
 Angela Carnon
 Sandy Dempsey
 Cyndee Summers
 Kathy Hilton
 Cedric Kent
 Norman Fields
 Angela Wade

References

External links
 

1974 films
1974 drama films
1970s English-language films
American drama films
American pornographic films
1970s American films